The Roman Catholic Diocese of Kurnool is a diocese located in the city of Kurnool in the Ecclesiastical province of Hyderabad in India.

History
 12 June 1967: Established as Diocese of Kurnool from the Diocese of Nellore

Leadership
 Bishops of Kurnool (Latin Rite)
 Rt. Rev. Msgr. Anthonappa Chowrappa (Apostolic Administrator - 20 November 2020 - Present)
 Bishop Anthony Poola (8 February 2008 – 19 November 2020) (later Archbishop of Hyderabad, Elevated to Cardinal by Pope Francis on 27 August 2022)
 Bishop Johannes Gorantla (6 December 1993 – 20 January 2007)
 Bishop Abraham Aruliah Somavarapa (Apostolic Administrator 1991 – 6 December 1993)
 Bishop Mathew Cheriankunnel, P.I.M.E. (18 January 1988 – 16 July 1991)
 Bishop Joseph Rajappa (12 June 1967 – 18 January 1988)

References

External links
 GCatholic.org 
 Catholic Hierarchy 

Roman Catholic dioceses in India
Christian organizations established in 1967
Roman Catholic dioceses and prelatures established in the 20th century
Christianity in Andhra Pradesh
1967 establishments in Andhra Pradesh
Kurnool